Nicolas Becker is a French composer and sound engineer. He won an Academy Award in the category Best Sound for the film Sound of Metal.

Selected filmography 
 Sound of Metal (2020, co-won with Jaime Baksht, Michelle Couttolenc, Carlos Cortés Navarrete and Phillip Bladh)

References

External links 

Living people
Place of birth missing (living people)
Year of birth missing (living people)
French audio engineers
French composers
Best Sound Mixing Academy Award winners
20th-century French engineers
21st-century French engineers
21st-century French composers